Wortmannin, a steroid metabolite of the fungi Penicillium funiculosum, Talaromyces wortmannii, is a non-specific, covalent inhibitor of phosphoinositide 3-kinases (PI3Ks).  It has an in vitro inhibitory concentration (IC50) of around 5 nM, making it a more  potent inhibitor than LY294002, another commonly used PI3K inhibitor. It displays a similar potency in vitro for the class I, II, and III PI3K members although it can also inhibit other PI3K-related enzymes such as mTOR, DNA-PKcs, some phosphatidylinositol 4-kinases, myosin light chain kinase (MLCK) and mitogen-activated protein kinase (MAPK)  at high concentrations Wortmannin has also been reported to inhibit members of the polo-like kinase family with IC50 in the same range as for PI3K.  The half-life of wortmannin in tissue culture is about 10 minutes due to the presence of the highly reactive C20 carbon that is also responsible for its ability to covalently inactivate PI3K.  Wortmannin is a commonly used cell biology reagent that has been used previously in research to inhibit DNA repair, receptor-mediated endocytosis and cell proliferation.

Phosphoinositide-3-kinase
Phosphoinositide-3-kinase (PI3K) activates an important cell survival signaling pathway, and constitutive activation is seen in ovarian, head and neck, urinary tract, cervical and small cell lung cancer. PI3K signaling is attenuated by the phosphatase activity of the tumor suppressor PTEN that is absent in a number of human cancers. Inhibiting PI3K presents the opportunity to inhibit a major cancer cell survival signaling pathway and to overcome the action of an important deleted tumor suppressor, providing antitumor activity and increased tumor sensitivity to a wide variety of drugs.

Wortmannin is a PI3K inhibitor; as such, it has detrimental influence on memory and impairs spatial learning abilities.

Derivatives
Medicinal chemistry research has been conducted to identify wortmannin derivatives that are more stable, while not losing its therapeutic effect.

Sonolisib

One of these, sonolisib (PX-866), has been shown to be an irreversible inhibitor of PI-3 kinase with efficacy when delivered orally. Sonolisib was put in a phase 1 clinical trial by Oncothyreon.  The clinical development plan for sonolisib includes both standalone and combination therapy in major human cancers. In 2010, sonolisib was starting 4 phase II trials for solid tumors. The company gave an update on its phase 2 trials in Jun 2012.  Phase 1 results (with docetaxel) published Aug 2013. In July 2014 published results of a phase 2 trial (for NSCLC) concluded : "The addition of PX-866 to docetaxel did not improve PFS, response rate, or OS in patients with advanced, refractory NSCLC without molecular preselection". In Sept 2015 as Phase 2 trial for recurrent glioblastoma reported not meeting its primary endpoint.

References

External links

 Wortmannin bound to proteins in the PDB

Acetate esters
Furans
Delta-lactones
Phosphoinositide 3-kinase inhibitors
Covalent inhibitors